Calvin William Ramsay (born 31 July 2003) is a Scottish professional footballer who currently plays ‍as a right-back for Premier League club Liverpool and the Scotland national team.

Club career

Aberdeen
After progressing through the youth ranks at Aberdeen, Ramsay made his debut as a late substitute against Dundee United in March 2021, under caretaker manager Paul Sheerin. Ramsay went on to make another five appearances in his first season with the senior team. He made his European debut for the club against Swedish side BK Häcken in July 2021 in a UEFA Conference League qualifier. He started at right back in a 5–1 win and assisting the first goal of the game. Ramsay won the SFWA Young Player of the Year award for 2021–22, his only full season with Aberdeen.

Liverpool
Ramsay moved to Premier League club Liverpool in June 2022. He signed a five-year contract for an initial fee of £4.2m, a club record sale for Aberdeen.

On 1 November 2022, Ramsey made his debut for Liverpool when he came on as an 87th minute substitute in the 2-0 win against Napoli in the 2022–23 UEFA Champions League.
On 9 November 2022, he started his first game for Liverpool in the win against Derby County in the third round of the EFL Cup at Anfield. In February 2023, having made only two appearances for Liverpool's first team, Ramsay was ruled out for the rest of the 2022–23 season following surgery on an unspecified injury.

International career
Ramsay was called up to the senior Scotland squad in November 2022. He made his international debut on 16 November in a 2-1 friendly defeat to Turkey.

Career statistics

Club

International

Honours
SFWA Young Player of the Year: 2021–22

References

External links
 Profile at the Liverpool F.C. website
 Profile at the Premier League website

2003 births
Living people
Scottish footballers
Footballers from Aberdeen
Aberdeen F.C. players
Scottish Professional Football League players
Association football fullbacks
Scotland youth international footballers
Scotland under-21 international footballers
Liverpool F.C. players
Scotland international footballers